Jirkatang is a small village in the South Andaman District of the Andaman and Nicobar islands union territory in India. Jirkatang is located along the National Highway 4 (India) and has a check post. Jirkatang on Google Maps is shown as 'Jirkatang Camp No. 7'. Jirkatang, following the National Highway 4, is about 44 kilometres (27 miles) away from the capital of the Andaman and Nicobar Islands, Port Blair. Due to the lack of maintained infrastructure in the area, a regular trip between the two places would take around an hour.

References 

Villages in South Andaman district